This is a list of lakes and reservoirs near the Mogollon Rim or on the Mogollon Plateau. The Mogollon Plateau lies northeast of the Mogollon Rim, trends northwesterly then east-by-southeast; both merge into the White Mountains (Arizona), bordering southwestern New Mexico.

Complete list

Bear Canyon Lake
Blue Ridge Reservoir
Chevelon Canyon Lake
Knoll Lake
Long Lake (Arizona)
Soldiers Lake
Soldiers Annex Lake
Stoneman Lake
Tremaine Lake
White Mountain Lake
Willow Springs Lake
Woods Canyon Lake

Mogollon Plateau bodies of water

Blue Ridge Reservoir–(Rim & Platea)
Chevelon Canyon Lake–(Rim & Platea)
Long Lake (Arizona)
Soldiers Lake
Soldiers Annex Lake
Stoneman Lake
Tremaine Lake
White Mountain Lake–(Rim & Platea)

Mogollon Rim

Bear Canyon Lake
Blue Ridge Reservoir–(Rim & Platea)
Chevelon Canyon Lake–(Rim & Platea)
Knoll Lake
Long Lake (Arizona)
White Mountain Lake–(Rim & Platea)
Willow Springs Lake
Woods Canyon Lake

Lakes below the Mogollon Rim

Stehr Lake
Theodore Roosevelt Lake

See also

List of lakes in Arizona

Mogollon Rim